The Beatgirls, a New Zealand girl group formed in 1996, performs covers of musical hits from different eras, with appropriate dance moves, glamorous costumes, and slyly racy banter between songs, in full cabaret shows or as hired entertainment for festivals and parties. While not a franchise, over the years, different trios of women have brought The Beatgirls' trademark humor, glamor, and musical talent to life around the world as well as across New Zealand, developing a degree of acceptance and cultural status across New Zealand's various social groups akin to that of the Topp Twins. While they are often referred to as The Beat Girls, even on their own official website, they most consistently bill themselves as The Beatgirls, including on their Facebook page.

Cultural significance 
Corporate-sponsored shows for employees are the main breadwinner for the group in New Zealand, but they're also popular draw cards for national events such as the Golden Shears. They appear at public and private venues, from local pubs, community centers, charity events, and retirement homes, to urban theaters and festivals. They have performed at Wellington's Circa Theatre since their inception, including, for example, the entire month of October in 2010. As Andrea Sanders, the group's co-founder, says, "We go from highbrow corporate dos to someone’s wedding in a small marquee; from the Martinborough Wine and Food Festival with a crowd of 10,000 people to the Eketāhuna firemen’s ball, where everyone was dancing in their socks.”

They are also familiar to New Zealand television audiences through their appearances on shows such as Good Morning and Dancing with the Stars. They have been profiled, interviewed, and featured on numerous other series about contemporary arts in New Zealand, e.g., Dream Jobs (2000), Wanda's Way (TVNZ, 2003), Big Night In (2003), Sunday (TVNZ, 2005), and Radio New Zealand Concert Programme's Upbeat (2017). They were also part of a live broadcast of an international comedy festival, The TV2 International LAUGH! Festival in 2002.

The Beatgirls have toured internationally around Europe, Asia, and the United States, as well as many of the Pacific islands. They have represented New Zealand overseas at major international events, including parties sponsored by Sports Illustrated at the 2000 and 2004 Olympics in Australia and Greece, a fact that led Grant Buist's popular Wellington-based cartoon strip, Jitterati, to express relief, contrasting their public persona with that of a contemporary New Zealand artwork sent abroad to a prestigious international arts event. After one of their performances in Greece Katie Couric booked them for an appearance on The Today Show.

The Beatgirls are based in Wellington, where the local newspaper has called them "as Wellington as the bucket fountain." In 2006 the Beatgirls were in competition with Weta Workshop for various regional and national awards (Richard Taylor won). Sanders, acting the part of a fantasy character named Diello in Peter Jackson's Heavenly Creatures (1994), got to play a love scene with Kate Winslet; in later years Jackson has hired the Beatgirls to entertain at parties.

Style 
Like the Topp Twins, the Beatgirls appeal to audiences because of their "energy, timing, humour and crowd interaction." They peg their selection of music to their audience's age, choosing music from the latter's teenage years. They appeal to audience nostalgia, but with enough edge that they have sometimes been called a "parody trio," although Sanders objects to that characterization: "We don't take the mickey out of the songs - it's just we don't take ourselves too seriously." While The Beatgirls began with music from the post-WWII era, when they expanded to '40s music, particularly from the Andrews Sisters, they became a hit at Anzac ceremonies and retirement homes; at the latter they have often performed for free.

The Beatgirls "are unashamedly 'entertainers.'" Sanders sees this as an advantage financially in the New Zealand entertainment world, but she also rejects the suggestions that they are less successful artists than "original" artists and that their success rests on their sex appeal; the costumes they wear, be they miniskirts or tight pants, reflect the costumes of performers whose work they perform.

Origins and personnel 
The group's origins lie in the personal relationship between Andrea Sanders and Billy Watkins, who were born near Wellington in Plimmerton and Paekākāriki respectively. After performing as a dancer and then a singer in Australia, Sanders returned to Wellington and joined Watkins' band called Billy and the Blue Flames, which played music in the style of Cab Calloway. In 1994 they set up a band called the Lounge Lizards to play bossa nova but soon found their way to the more lucrative Beatgirls format. Sanders is the group's owner, manager, choreographer, and one of the group's lead singers; Watkins also plays multiple roles, from body guard, business manager, and occasional guitarist, to sound and light technician.

Group members have included Carolyn McLaughlin (also known as Carolyn Lambourn), Bea Lee-Smith, Erika Takacs, Emily Mowbray, Kali Gazley, Mel Golding, Christina Cuisel  Kali Kopae, and Nahrelle Ahrens. McLaughlin is a sound-effects technician working in both film and television. Ahrens also works in film and theatre, and as a voice-over artist.

While working in Sydney for an extended period of time at the turn of this century, Sanders and Watkins established a "second-tier BeatGirls trio" based there but managed by Sanders and Watkins from New Zealand once they returned.

Sanders "trained in Russian classical ballet" before studying contemporary dance with Deirdre Tarrant; her first professional employment as a dancer was with Michael Parmenter. She is also a marriage celebrant, which adds to the sort of gigs the Beatgirls can promote themselves for.

References

External links 
 

New Zealand music
New Zealand comedy musical groups
New Zealand women comedians
Cover bands
1990s in New Zealand music
Musical groups established in 1996